Amirabad may refer to:

Bangladesh
Amirabad Union, Lohagara, a union of Chittagong Division

Iran

Ardabil Province
Amirabad, Ardabil, a village in Ardabil County
Amirabad, Kowsar, a village in Kowsar County

Chaharmahal and Bakhtiari Province
Amirabad, Kiar, a village in Kiar County
Amirabad, Kuhrang, a village in Kuhrang County
Amirabad, Bazoft, a village in Kuhrang County

East Azerbaijan Province
Amirabad, Charuymaq, a village in Charuymaq County
Amirabad, Kaleybar, a village in Kaleybar County
Amirabad, Maragheh, a village in Maragheh County
Amirabad, Marand, a village in Marand County
Amirabad, Garmeh-ye Jonubi, a village in Meyaneh County
Amirabad, Sheykhdarabad, a village in Meyaneh County
Amirabad, Varzaqan, a village in Varzaqan County

Fars Province
Amirabad, Abadeh, a village in Abadeh County
Amirabad Kaftar, a village in Eqlid County
Amirabad-e Karbalayi Khosrow, a village in Eqlid County
Amirabad-e Panjahopanj, a village in Sarvestan County
Amirabad-e Panjahoshesh, a village in Sarvestan County
Amirabad, Sepidan, a village in Sepidan County
Amirabad, Shiraz, a village in Shiraz County

Gilan Province
Amirabad, Gilan, a village in Lahijan County

Golestan Province
Amirabad, Golestan, a village in Gorgan County
Amirabad-e Fenderesk, a village in Aliabad County
Amirabad-e Sorkh Mahalleh, a village in Aliabad County

Hamadan Province
Amirabad-e Ali Nur, a village in Famenin County
Amirabad-e Kord, a village in Hamadan County
Amirabad, Kabudarahang, a village in Kabudarahang County
Amirabad, Nahavand, a village in Nahavand County
Amirabad, Khezel, a village in Nahavand County
Amirabad, alternate name of Badiabad, Hamadan, a village in Nahavand County
Amirabad, alternate name of Oshvand, a village in Nahavand County
Amirabad, Razan, a village in Razan County

Hormozgan Province
Amirabad, Hormozgan, a village in Minab County, Hormozgan Province, Iran

Isfahan Province
Amirabad, Ardestan, a village in Ardestan County
Amirabad, Semirom, a village in Semirom County
Amirabad, Padena, a village in Semirom County

Kerman Province

Anbarabad County
Amirabad, Anbarabad, a village in Anbarabad County
Amirabad-e Bala, a village in Anbarabad County
Amirabad-e Kot Gorg, a village in Anbarabad County
Amirabad-e Nazarian, a village in Anbarabad County
Amirabad-e Pain, Kerman, a village in Anbarabad County

Arzuiyeh County
Amirabad, Arzuiyeh, a village in Arzuiyeh County

Baft County
Amirabad (29°27′ N 56°32′ E), Baft, a village in Baft County
Amirabad (29°28′ N 56°25′ E), Baft, a village in Baft County

Bam County
Amirabad, Bam, a village in Bam County

Jiroft County
Amirabad, Maskun, a village in Jiroft County
Amirabad, Saghder, a village in Jiroft County

Kerman County
Amirabad, Qanatghestan, a village in Kerman County
Amirabad, Shahdad, a village in Kerman County

Rabor County
Amirabad, Rabor, a village in Rabor County

Sirjan County
Amirabad, Malekabad, a village in Sirjan County
Amirabad, Pariz, a village in Sirjan County
Amirabad-e Amirqoli, a village in Sirjan County

Kermanshah Province
Amirabad, Kermanshah, a village in Kermanshah County
Amirabad, Kuzaran, a village in Kermanshah County
Amirabad, Dinavar, a village in Sahneh County
Amirabad, Kanduleh, a village in Sahneh County

Khuzestan Province
Amirabad, Izeh, a village in Izeh County
Amirabad, Dehdez, a village in Izeh County
Amirabad, Tolbozan, a village in Masjed Soleyman County
Amirabad, Tombi Golgir, a village in Masjed Soleyman County

Kohgiluyeh and Boyer-Ahmad Province
Amirabad-e Babakan, a village in Boyer-Ahmad County
Amirabad-e Olya, a village in Boyer-Ahmad County
Amirabad-e Sofla, a village in Boyer-Ahmad County
Amirabad-e Vosta Key Mohammad Khan, a village in Boyer-Ahmad County
Amirabad, Dana, a village in Dana County
Amirabad, Kohgiluyeh, a village in Kohgiluyeh County

Kurdistan Province
Amirabad, Bijar, a village in Bijar County
Amirabad, Dehgolan, a village in Dehgolan County
Amirabad, Bolbanabad, a village in Dehgolan County
Amirabad, Kamyaran, a village in Kamyaran County
Amirabad Rural District, in Kamyaran County

Lorestan Province

Borujerd County
Amirabad, Borujerd, a village in Borujerd County

Delfan County
Gashur-e Amirabad, a village in Delfan County

Dorud County
Amirabad (33°23′ N 48°58′ E), Dorud, a village in Dorud County
Amirabad (33°34′ N 49°00′ E), Dorud, a village in Dorud County

Dowreh County
Amirabad Cham Gaz, a village in Dowreh County

Khorramabad County
Amirabad, Khorramabad

Selseleh County
Amirabad, Selseleh
Amirabad-e Nadar
Amirabad Haq Nader

Markazi Province
Amirabad, Ashtian, a village in Ashtian County
Amirabad, Farahan, a village in Farahan County
Amirabad, Khomeyn, a village in Khomeyn County
Amirabad, Mahallat, a village in Mahallat County
Amirabad-e Bezanjan, a village in Mahallat County
Amirabad, Zarandieh, a village in Zarandieh County

Mazandaran Province
Amirabad, Amol, a village in Amol County
Amirabad, Behshahr, a village in Behshahr County
Amirabad, Nur, a village in Nur County
Amirabad, Savadkuh, a village in Savadkuh County
Amirabad, Tonekabon, a village in Tonekabon County

North Khorasan Province
Amirabad, Bojnord, a village in Bojnord County
Amirabad, Faruj, a village in Faruj County
Amirabad, Jajrom, a village in Jajrom County
Amirabad, Shirvan, a village in Shirvan County

Qazvin Province
Amirabad, Qazvin
Amirabad-e Eqbal
Amirabad-e Kohneh
Amirabad-e Now
Amirabad, alternate name of Chaman-e Amirabad

Razavi Khorasan Province
Amirabad, Chenaran, a village in Chenaran County
Amirabad, Firuzeh, a village in Firuzeh County
Amirabad, Kalat, a village in Kalat County
Amirabad, Mashhad, a village in Mashhad County
Amirabad, Ahmadabad, a village in Mashhad County
Amirabad, Razaviyeh, a village in Mashhad County
Amirabad, Miyan Jolgeh, a village in Nishapur County
Amirabad, Torbat-e Heydarieh, a village in Torbat-e Heydarieh County
Amirabad, Torbat-e Jam, a village in Torbat-e Jam County

Semnan Province
Amirabad, Semnan, a village in Adaran County
Amirabad, former name of Amiriyeh, a city in Damghan County
Amirabad, Shahrud, a village in Shahrud County
Amirabad District, in Damghan County

Sistan and Baluchestan Province
Amirabad, Qasr-e Qand, a village in Qasr-e Qand County

South Khorasan Province
Amirabad-e Pain, South Khorasan, a village in Birjand County
Amirabad-e Sheybani, a village in Birjand County
Amirabad, Darmian, a village in Darmian County
Amirabad, Qaen, a village in Qaen County
Amirabad-e Sarzeh, a village in Sarbisheh County
Amirabad, Dastgerdan, a village in Tabas County
Amirabad, Deyhuk, a village in Tabas County
Amirabad, Zirkuh, a village in Zirkuh County

Tehran Province
Amirabad, Tehran, a village in Malard County
Amirabad, Varamin, a village in Varamin County
Amirabad-e Kolahchi, a village in Malard County, Tehran Province, Iran
Amirabad, alternate name of Qeshlaq-e Amirabad, a village in Malard County, Tehran Province, Iran

West Azerbaijan Province
Amirabad, Bukan, a village in Bukan County
Amirabad, Miandoab, a village in Miandoab County
Amirabad, Oshnavieh, a village in Oshnavieh County

Yazd Province
Amirabad, Aliabad, a village in Taft County
Amirabad, Nir, a village in Taft County

Zanjan Province
Amirabad, Abhar, a village in Abhar County
Amirabad, Sain Qaleh, a village in Abhar County
Amirabad, Soltaniyeh, a village in Abhar County
Amirabad, Mahneshan, a village in Mahneshan County
Amirabad, Anguran, a village in Mahneshan County

Pakistan
Amirabad, Pakistan, a town in Khyber-Pakhtunkhwa, Pakistan

See also
 
 Mirabad (disambiguation)